This is a list of all freight railroad (not streetcar or rapid transit) lines that have been built in Rhode Island, and does not deal with ownership changes from one company to another. The lines are named by the first company to build or consolidate them. Unless noted, every railroad eventually became part of the New York, New Haven and Hartford Railroad system.

List of railroad lines in Rhode Island

See also

List of Rhode Island railroads

References

Railroadlines
Rhode Island